The Cavaliers AudioVerse is an American radio network composed of 19 radio stations which carry English-language coverage of the Cleveland Cavaliers, a professional basketball team in the National Basketball Association (NBA). Cleveland sister stations WTAM and WMMS serve as the network's two flagships; WTAM also relays its signal over a low-power FM translator. The network also includes seventeen affiliates in the U.S. state of Ohio: twelve AM stations, nine of which supplement their signals with low-power FM translators and one with an HD Radio subchannel; and six full-power FM stations.

Tim Alcorn is the current play-by-play announcer, while Jim Chones serves as color analyst. In addition to traditional over-the-air AM and FM broadcasts, network programming airs on SiriusXM satellite radio; and streams online via SiriusXM Internet Radio, TuneIn Premium, and NBA League Pass Audio.

History
In 2008, longtime flagship WTAM signed a five-year contract extension with the Cavaliers through the 2013–14 season; in 2011, a Cavs spokesman stated there were "multiple years" remaining on the team's contract with WTAM, without specifying an end date.  In 2014, WTAM owner iHeartMedia (formerly Clear Channel) announced a new "multi-year" contract with the team; this new arrangement also established simulcasts on WTAM sister station WMMS. Additional affiliates were added in the Columbus, Dayton and Cincinnati markets, coinciding with LeBron James' heavily publicized return to the team.

John Michael took over as the team's lead play-by-play announcer starting in the 2011–12 season following the retirement of longtime radio voice Joe Tait. After the death of lead TV play-by-play announcer Fred McLeod prior to the start of the 2019–20 season, Michael was reassigned to that position, with Tim Alcorn—lead sports announcer and station manager at Cavaliers radio affiliate WEOL in Elyria—being hired as Michael's successor.

The radio network was rebranded as the "Cavaliers AudioVerse" beginning with the 2022–23 season.

Announcers

Station list

Asterisk (*) indicates HD Radio broadcast.
Blue background indicates low-power FM translator.

Network map

References

External links
 Cavaliers Radio Network
 SiriusXM.com: Cleveland Cavaliers
 TuneIn.com: Cleveland Cavaliers
 NBA League Pass Audio

National Basketball Association on the radio
Radio in Cleveland
Sports radio networks in the United States